Mazaj 95.3 FM is a privately owned radio station located in Amman, Jordan. The station was established in 2005 and is owned by the National Broadcast Company, which was founded by Abu-Lughod Studios and Seagulls Broadcast Ltd.

Format
The station focuses on giving its audience the latest Arabic pop music as well as popular Arabic hits played throughout the past decades.

External links
Official website

Radio stations in Jordan
Mass media in Amman
Radio stations established in 2005